AirClass Airways was an airline based in Las Palmas de Gran Canaria, Canary Islands, Spain. It operated passenger services from Spain, as well as charters and wet lease services. Its main base was Gran Canaria International Airport.

History

The airline started operations in February 2003. It was founded by Canaria Travel as a sister company to the airline Travel Service under the name Visig Operaciones Aéreas. Operations started with a Boeing 737-800 transferred from Travel Service. Visig was closed down in 2005 and in November 2005 the company was acquired by Spanish investment group Airclass and reorganised by Futura International Airways. In May 2006 the company was rebranded as AirClass Airways. It was wholly owned by Airclass and had 48 employees.

AirClass Airways ceased operations in 2008.

Fleet
The AirClass Airways fleet consisted of the following aircraft (as of May 2006):

2 Boeing 737-300

References

External links

AirClass Airways

Defunct airlines of Spain
Defunct charter airlines
Airlines established in 2003
Airlines disestablished in 2008